UDP-sulfoquinovose synthase is an enzyme that catalyzes the chemical reaction

UDP-glucose + sulfite  UDP-6-sulfoquinovose + H2O

Thus, the two substrates of this enzyme are UDP-glucose and sulfite, whereas its two products are UDP-6-sulfoquinovose and H2O.

In a subsequent reaction catalyzed by sulfoquinovosyl diacylglycerol synthase, the sulfoquinovose portion of UDP-sulfoquinovose is combined with diacyglycerol to produce the sulfolipid sulfoquinovosyl diacylglycerol (SQDG).

This enzyme belongs to the family of hydrolases, specifically those acting on carbon-sulfur bonds.  The systematic name of this enzyme class is UDP-6-sulfo-6-deoxyglucose sulfohydrolase. Other names in common use include sulfite:UDP-glucose sulfotransferase, and UDP-sulfoquinovose synthase.  This enzyme participates in nucleotide sugars metabolism and glycerolipid metabolism.

The 3-dimensional structure of the enzyme is known from Protein Data Bank entries 1qrr  (Mulichak et al., 1999), 1i24, 1i2b and 1i2c.

See also
 Sulfoquinovose

References

 
 
 

EC 3.13.1
Enzymes of known structure